Warren Godfrey (March 23, 1931 – April 5, 1997) was a Canadian ice hockey defenceman. He played in the National Hockey League with the Boston Bruins and Detroit Red Wings between 1952 and 1968.

Playing career
Godfrey began his National Hockey League career with the Boston Bruins in 1952. He spent the majority of his career with the Detroit Red Wings where he retired following the 1968 season. He also spent time in the Pacific Coast Hockey League, American Hockey League and Central Hockey League.

Godfrey scored his first NHL goal as a member of the Boston Bruins.  It occurred on January 11, 1953 in Boston's 4-2 loss to Detroit.

Career statistics

Regular season and playoffs

External links 

1931 births
1997 deaths
Boston Bruins players
Canadian ice hockey defencemen
Detroit Red Wings players
Fort Worth Wings players
Galt Red Wings players
Memphis Wings players
Ontario Hockey Association Senior A League (1890–1979) players
Pittsburgh Hornets players
Rochester Americans players
Ice hockey people from Toronto
Tacoma Rockets (WHL) players
Waterloo Hurricanes players